Saint Maurice is a majority black census-designated place and unincorporated community in Winn Parish, Louisiana. United States. Its population was 323 as of the 2010 census. Its ZIP code is 71471.

History
Until June 5, 1981, the historic St. Maurice Plantation sat near the bank of the Red River which is now an oxbow.

References

Unincorporated communities in Winn Parish, Louisiana
Unincorporated communities in Louisiana
Census-designated places in Winn Parish, Louisiana
Census-designated places in Louisiana
Populated places in Ark-La-Tex
Populated places established by African Americans